The Angry God is a 1948 American drama film directed by Van Campen Heilner and written by Lester Crocker and Harold McCracken. The film stars Alice Parla, Casimiro Ortega and Mario Forastieri. The film was released on March 14, 1948, by United Artists.

Plot

Cast  
Alice Parla as Mapoli 
Casimiro Ortega as Colima
Mario Forastieri as Nezatl

References

External links 
 

1948 films
American black-and-white films
United Artists films
1948 drama films
American drama films
Films set in Mexico
1940s English-language films
1940s American films